The Watford DC line is a suburban line from London Euston to Watford Junction in Watford, Hertfordshire. Its services are operated by London Overground.

The line runs beside the West Coast Main Line (WCML) for most of its length. The London Underground Bakerloo line shares the section of the line from Queen's Park to Harrow & Wealdstone. The rolling stock used on the line are Class 710 "Aventras" made by Bombardier.

The "DC" in the title refers to line being electrified using direct current. This was done in the early twentieth century with conductor rails (for compatibility with the London Underground's four-rail system and the now AC/DC-split semi-orbital North London Line). By contrast, the WCML uses overhead alternating current.

History
Services on this line began when London and North Western Railway (LNWR) completed the Camden to Watford Junction new line in 1912, to provide additional suburban capacity and more outer-suburban services running non-stop to Euston. It incorporated part of the LNWR Rickmansworth branch (formerly the Watford and Rickmansworth Railway) between Watford Junction and Watford High Street Junction and part of the original slow main line between Queen's Park and South Hampstead stations; two single-track tunnels take the line from South Hampstead to Camden, whence the line reaches Euston station by the main-line tracks. Prior to 1912, at which time the entire route was finally electrified, services were steam operated. Although the operation of the line is mostly self-contained, connections at Watford Junction and Camden allow other trains onto it, a facility used occasionally with trains diverted from the West Coast Main Line should an alternative diversionary route be not available.

Signalling
The line opened with conventional semaphore signalling mechanically operated from signal boxes at each station, this system remained in use after electrification.

The London, Midland and Scottish Railway introduced an automatic electric signalling system in the early 1930s over most of the route and some signal boxes were abolished. A similar system was also used for a shorter period between Bromley-by-Bow and Upminster now part of the District line. The very closely spaced mix of automatic and semi-automatic signals, repeater signals, and auxiliary calling-on aspects was intended to let trains to proceed, after a set delay, at low speed past "failed" signals on track with no junctions without the need to contact a signalman, but this could lead to a nose-to-tail queue of trains as they all reached the location of a real line blockage.

Train stops were provided (except at repeater signals) to allow London Electric Railway (LER) trains to operate over the line without the special provision of a second man; this enabled the same practice to be continued with all other Underground and main line stock subsequently allocated to this line and which was provided with trip equipment.

Signal boxes remaining in use in the early 1970s included:
 Kilburn High Road (closed when the crossover moved to the down side of the station)
 Queens Park No.3 (closed when control passed to Willesden)
 Willesden New Station
 Stonebridge Power House (abolished after LU Bakerloo line depot opened)
 Harrow No.2
Normally Kilburn High Road and Stonebridge Power House which controlled only plain track with crossovers were switched out and only Queens Park, Willesden and Harrow boxes were staffed for at least part of the day, to deal with junction and siding traffic. In the early 1980s manual control of signalling was needed for a few months after dragging gear on a train destroyed many electric train-stops which were of a design almost confined to this line (LU train-stops are mostly electro-pneumatic). By this time the signal boxes at Stonebridge Power House and Kilburn High Road had been abolished. Emergency crossovers at other locations were controlled by  ground frames enclosed in structures the size of a garden shed.

In 1988 the LMS system was replaced by a more standard system controlled from a new signal box, Willesden Suburban, and the remaining local boxes were abolished. The new system had solid state interlocking, but far fewer signals; as a consequence the maximum traffic capacity of the line was severely reduced. In the early 1960s there were headways of less than 2 minutes between Harrow & Wealdstone and Willesden Junction stations, the section of line used by nearly all services.

In the early 2000s Willesden Suburban was closed and control passed to Wembley Main Line Signalling Centre.

Electrification

The original electrification was on a fourth rail system, similar to that now used by London Underground, which allowed LER trains to use the new line. Power was supplied from the railway's own power station at Stonebridge Park until the 1960s when it was closed, after which it has been obtained from public supplies. As originally installed, there was provision for interconnection of the high voltage section of the power station to adjacent public supplies for output or intake but this ceased when national supplies were standardised at 50 Hz.

In the late 1950s, the original electric multiple units built for the line were replaced by new Class 501 rolling stock. These were in turn displaced in the mid 1980s by Class 313 units. The line is now operated by London Overground Class 710 "Aventra" units.

In the 1970s, the track and the rolling stock used on this line and the North London Line were changed to use a modified version of the BR standard third rail system, with the fourth rail (now bonded to the running rail used for returning traction current) left in place on the sections of line shared with LU Bakerloo line trains. North of Harrow & Wealdstone, now the limit of LU operation, the fourth rail has in most places been dropped onto the sleepers and remains bonded, thus leaving the resistance of the current return path unaltered. The fourth rail remains in the normal position from Queens Park to Kilburn High Road up platform, where a trailing crossover between those two stations is maintained in use to allow reversal of Bakerloo line trains unable to gain access to London Underground at Queens Park, due to planned work or other reasons. The line is currently electrified (like all shared lines) using the standard compromise voltage of 660 V DC. This falls comfortably within the lower permanent voltage limit for the  "Capitalstar" stock (500 V) and the upper permanent voltage limit for the 1972 tube stock (760 V). The line has now been converted to 750 V DC for the new  "Aventra".

A consequence of converting to third rail with the fourth rail provided only for LU use was that both planned and emergency use of the line by other 3rd-rail-capable trains was possible. Ignoring recent use of Class 508 trains, this last took place when Class 416 trains were diverted to Willesden Junction Low Level station when part of the North London Line was closed for a number of weeks in the late 1980s.

The electricity grid Willesden substation in Acton Lane, Park Royal supplies 11 kV, three-phase power to ten substations on the line, located at Camden, South Hampstead, Queens Park, Willesden, Harlesden, Wembley, Kenton, Harrow, Hatch End, Bushey and Watford.

Growth
The construction of a curve to link Rickmansworth (Church Street) to the Euston main line was planned. A new line would have then run south to Wembley, then passed under the main line and run on the east side to Euston, terminating in a loop.

The loop was dropped on grounds of cost and, instead, services terminated at Euston main platforms or ran on the North London Railway to Broad Street. Pressure from local groups led to the building of a curve near Bushey, diverting the main route for new services over the existing branch line north to Watford Junction instead of south to Rickmansworth. In 1917 LER Bakerloo line services were extended over the new line from Queen's Park station to Watford Junction.

Decline
Bakerloo line services were cut back in stages and ceased north of Stonebridge Park station in 1982; in 1984 they were restored as far as Harrow and Wealdstone.

The Croxley Green branch fell into disuse in the 1990s, and is now derelict. In the early 2000s the county council proposed to divert the Metropolitan line over the branch and on to Watford Junction (for more information see Croxley Rail Link).

Operators

The line was operated by British Rail (from 1986 as Network SouthEast) until privatisation. In the Network SouthEast period, it was rebranded as the Harlequin line, after the stations of Harlesden and Queen's Park.

From March 1997 until November 2007, the line was operated by Silverlink. In November 2007 Transport for London (TfL) took full management control of all the intermediate Watford DC line stations as part of the London Overground (LO) service with staffing during opening hours, automatic ticket gates and planned station refurbishment to the standard of the Tube network.

Services

The local passenger services which run over the DC line are:
 Watford Junction to Euston, operated by London Overground; services run through Watford High Street and all stations to Euston; at Willesden Junction trains stop at the low-level platforms;
 Harrow & Wealdstone or Stonebridge Park to Queen's Park, operated as the Bakerloo line; these services share track with Overground services as far as Queen's Park, before branching off onto dedicated underground tracks via central London to Elephant and Castle.

During the partial closure of the North London Line in autumn 2008, London Overground's Monday to Saturday services were diverted away from Euston, running instead via  onto the North London Line and on to Stratford; the Sunday service was normal.

London Northwestern Railway also run a fast service between Watford Junction and London Euston along the West Coast Main Line (which runs parallel to the Watford DC Line), calling at Bushey and Harrow & Wealdstone before running non-stop to Euston. The service offers a quicker alternative to the all-stations London Overground service, especially as the operator now accepts TfL's Oystercard ticketing. Some peak services to/from Euston are advertised as starting/terminating at South Hampstead or Queens Park or Harrow and Wealdstone in order to persuade passengers to take the frequent faster services.

Discontinued services
Past services have included:
  to Euston or Broad Street
 Croxley Green to Watford Junction
 Watford Junction (or Bushey & Oxhey) to LU Bakerloo line via Queens Park

When the south curve of the triangular junction between Watford High Street and Bushey existed, a few trains used Croxley Depot (now demolished), which was shared by LU and BR trains.

An interchange with the Stanmore branch line once existed at Harrow & Wealdstone. This short branch line was closed in 1964 as part of the Beeching cuts; the empty trackbed is still visible at Harrow & Wealdstone adjacent to the eastern ticket office.

Future

Metropolitan line

Another proposal to bring London Underground service to Watford Junction is the Croxley Rail Link, which envisages diverting the Watford branch of the Metropolitan line along a re-opened stretch of track to the west of Watford, effectively reinstating the former Croxley Green to Watford Junction service. Underground trains would then join the DC line at Watford High Street, potentially forming an interchange either with London Overground or the Bakerloo line, depending on the outcome of other projects.  Funding for this project was agreed during November 2015.

References

External links 
 

Railway lines in London
London Overground
Transport in the London Borough of Camden
Transport in the London Borough of Brent
Transport in the London Borough of Harrow
Rail transport in Hertfordshire
Transport in Watford
750 V DC railway electrification
Railway lines opened in 1922
Standard gauge railways in England